Vladimir R. Petković (Donja Livadica, Serbia, 30 September 1874 – Belgrade, Yugoslavia, 13 November 1956) was a Serbian art historian who initiated this scientific discipline in the Serbian cultural milieu. He was also a professor at the University of Belgrade.

Biography
He received his elementary education in his hometown, Oreovica, Kuseljevo, Svilajnac and in Kragujevac he attended high school. He studied the Department of Philology and History at the Grandes écoles in Belgrade between 1893 and 1897. He attended doctoral studies at the universities of Munich and Halle. Between 1900 and 1905 he served as assistant custodian of the warden of the National Museum in Belgrade, and between 1905 and 1909 he taught as a part-time professor at the Faculty of Engineering, University of Belgrade. He became a full professor at the Faculty of Philosophy in Belgrade in 1911. He was the founder of the Seminar for the History of Art in 1919 where he was appointed associate professor in 1919 and full professor in 1922. In the 1920s he led the National Museum of Serbia's field project at Stobi.

Scientific work
Petković was involved in scientific and pedagogical work, but his organizational work was also important. Between 1921 and 1935 he was the director of the National Museum in Belgrade, then between 1947 and 1956 the director of the Serbian Academy of Sciences and Arts's Archeological Institute and also held the duties of some scientific and professional publications, including the Starinar magazine (1931–1956). He was a regular member of the Serbian Academy of Sciences and Arts and a member of several European learned societies.

The main area of scientific research of Vladimir Petkovic was Serbian medieval art, especially fresco painting. In Serbian historiography, he laid the foundations for the scientific study of monumental heritage.
He gained his knowledge during his extensive fieldwork, after which he published numerous articles and monographic studies on Serbian medieval monasteries, churches, and paintings. He published well-known collections of material on medieval frescoes in Serbia and Macedonia, and his review of church monuments is particularly significant.

He wrote about the stylistic characteristics of painting, especially iconography when he noticed the existence of special schools in Serbian medieval painting. He was also the first to pay attention to the importance of late medieval monuments - the sixteenth and seventeenth centuries, part of which he published. He worked as an archeologist in Stoby and the Empress City.

See also
 Milan Kašanin
 Svetozar Radojčić

Bibliography
 1906 Žiča, Architecture and Painting", Starinar, Belgrade
 1908 "Frescoes from the Inner Narthex of the church in Kalenić", Starinar, Belgrade
 1911 "Serbian Monuments of the 7th-8th Centuries", Starinar, Belgrade
 1922 Ravanica Monastery, Belgrade
 1924 Studenica Monastery, Belgrade
 1926 Kalenić Monastery, Vršac
 1933 Staro Nagoričane - Psača - Kalenić (iconography and painting), Belgrade
 1937 Antique sculptures in Stobi, Starinar, Belgrade
 1939 "Excavation of the Emperor's City near Lebanon in 1938", Starinar, Belgrade
 1941 Dečani Monastery, Belgrade
 1950 A review of church monuments through the Serbian People's Narrative, Belgrade

References

1874 births
1956 deaths
People from Velika Plana